Uroleucon erigeronense, described by Thomas (1878), is a species of aphid that feeds on plants of the Erigeron or fleabane genus.  It also feeds on other plants, including Eriophyllum.

References

External links
 

Insects described in 1878
Macrosiphini